Cross Infinite World is a California-based language localization company specializing in Japanese to English translation and publication of Japanese media such as light novels and manga.

History 
Founded in 2016, Cross Infinite World is a localization company working directly with Japanese authors, artists, and manga artists. Cross Infinite World released their first light novel series My Favorite Song ~The Silver Siren~ on May 16, 2016, in digital format. Shortly thereafter, they announced the acquisition of The Violet Knight light novel series.

Originally known to be aiming for Shoujo and Josei Light Novels Cross Infinite World announced their plans to cross into Manga Publishing.

On August 23, 2016, Cross Infinite World announced the licensing of two Manga titles, Gleam, and Little Hero.

May 2, 2017, Cross Infinite World announced the licensing of the light novels: Akaoni: Contract with a Vampire, I Became the Secretary of a Hero!, and the manga Yusen Ruten: An Era of Red.

January 8, 2018, Cross Infinite World expands their retail platform to Google Play and iBooks for the first time.

August 22, 2019, Cross Infinite World Begins release of printed versions of their digital Light Novels. Print of 8 different light novel series announced.

October 12, 2021, In partnership with Podium Audio, Cross Infinite World announces their lineup of Audiobooks. 

April 30, 2022, Cross Infinite World expands their print platform to Right Stuf Anime.

Publications

Light Novels 
My Favorite Song ~The Silver Siren~
The Violet Knight
Akaoni: Contract with a Vampire
I Became the Secretary of a Hero!
Obsessions of an Otome Gamer
Mia and the Forbidden Medicine Report
Little Princess in Fairy Forest
The Champions of Justice and the Supreme Ruler of Evil
Dawn of the Mapmaker: The Surveyor Girl and the Forbidden Knowledge
The Eccentric Master and the Fake Lover
emeth: Island of Golems
The Cursed Princess and the Lucky Knight
Labyrinth Angel
Root Double -Before Crime * After Days
The Werewolf Count and the Trickster Tailor
Of Dragons and Fae: Is a Fairy Tale Ending Possible for the Princess’s Hairstylist?
Beast † Blood
Another World’s Zombie Apocalypse Is Not My Problem!
The Misfortune Devouring Witch is Actually a Vampire?
Hello, I am a Witch and my Crush Wants me to Make a Love Potion!
The Weakest Manga Villainess Wants Her Freedom!
Past Life Countess, Present Life Otome Game NPC?!
Reset! The Imprisoned Princess Dreams of Another Chance!
I Reincarnated As Evil Alice, So the Only Thing I’m Courting Is Death!
As The Villainess, I Reject These Happy-Bad Endings!
Reincarnated as the Last of My Kind
Since I Was Abandoned After Reincarnating, I Will Cook With My Fluffy Friends
Hey! You’ve Kidnapped the Wrong Royal!
Romance of the Imperial Capital Kotogami: A Tale of Living Alongside Spirits
Return from Death: I Kicked the Bucket and Now I’m Back at Square One With a Boyfriend Who Doesn’t Remember Me
So You Want to Live the Slow Life? A Guide to Life in the Beastly Wilds
Reflection of Another World
Even Dogs Go to Other Worlds: Life in Another World with My Beloved Hound
The Dragon’s Soulmate is a Mushroom Princess!
Onmyoji and Tengu Eyes: The Spirit Hunters of Tomoe
Expedition Cooking with the Enoch Royal Knights
Rapunzel of the Magic Item Shop
The Princess’ Smile: The Body-Double Bride Searches for Happiness with the Reclusive Prince
The Drab Princess, the Black Cat, and the Satisfying Break-up
Apocalypse Bringer Mynoghra: World Conquest Starts with the Civilization of Ruin

Audiobooks 
Reincarnated as the Last of My Kind
Reset! The Imprisoned Princess Dreams of Another Chance!
Apocalypse Bringer Mynoghra: World Conquest Starts with the Civilization of Ruin

Manga 
 Gleam
 Little Hero
 Yusen Ruten: An Era of Red
Tia La Cherla

References

External links 

 Official Website
 

Companies based in California
Manga distributors
Japanese-American culture in California
Book publishing companies based in California
Japanese language
English-language mass media